How to Get Lucky (3x30') was a reality TV dating series shown on BBC Three in the United Kingdom.

Aired in July 2005 (repeated September 2005), each episode followed one young woman looking for love.

External links 
Guardian review

BBC Television shows
British reality television series